Mr. Piper is a 1963 Canadian children's TV series.  The series was created by Martin Andrews and Allan Wargon, who was also the producer. 39 episodes were produced.

Overview
The show's host was a large Canadian opera tenor Alan Crofoot, dressed as a Pied Piper with a flower in his hat. He would introduce four segments in each half-hour programme:
Teletune - as a narrator of limited animation cartoons of fantasy stories
Port of Call - presenter of films about children and events in other lands;
Bag of Tricks - Crofoot performs magic tricks;
Animal Farm - many farmyard characters telling the story of the day in miniature barnyard sets, featuring Rupert the Rat, Bessie the Bunny, Kookie the Kitten, Harriet Hen, Freddie Frog, Calvin (Rac)Coon and Charlotte Cow.

Thirty-nine episodes were produced.

It was originally shown by CBC Television and also became well known in the United Kingdom, where it was repeated on ITV throughout the 1960s and 1970s, often as part of  school summer holiday programming.  In May/June 1972, some Mr. Piper episodes were transmitted, dubbed into Italian, by the RAI-TV network.

Episode list
Oh My Baby
Ali Baba
Brave Molly
It's A Triple
Touch Me
Hasty and the Princess
The Kindhearted Girl
The Magic Horn
The Three Sisters
The Proud Princess
It Grew Two Sizes
Ahmed the Merchant
Hansel and Gretel
The Wild Swans
The Tin Soldier
The Three Brothers
Hassan the Simple
The Three Soldiers

References

External links
  
Alan Crofoot on Canadian Encyclopedia

1960s Canadian animated television series
Television series by ITC Entertainment
CBC Television original programming
1963 Canadian television series debuts
1964 Canadian television series endings
1960s Canadian children's television series
Black-and-white Canadian television shows
Canadian television series with live action and animation
English-language television shows